Eticuera Creek is one of four primary tributaries that drain into Lake Berryessa in northern Napa County, California. The other three are Pope Creek, Capell Creek, and Putah Creek.

The creek generally drains in a north to south direction.

The upper reaches of the watershed also once supported the now defunct mining town of Knoxville.

References 

Rivers of Napa County, California